Brookings is a city in Curry County, Oregon, United States. It was named after John E. Brookings, president of the Brookings Lumber and Box Company, which founded the city in 1908. As of the 2020 census, the population was 6,744.

History

Founding 

In 1906, the Brookings Timber Company hired William James Ward, a graduate in civil engineering and forestry, to come to the southern Oregon Coast and survey its lumbering potential. After timber cruising the Chetco and Pistol River areas for several years, he recommended that the Brookings people begin extensive lumbering operations here and secure a townsite for a mill and shipping center.

While John E. Brookings was responsible for the founding of Brookings as a company town, it was his cousin, Robert S. Brookings, who was responsible for its actual design. The latter Brookings hired Bernard Maybeck, an architect based in San Francisco who was later involved in the Panama–Pacific International Exposition, to lay out the plat of the townsite.

World War II 

On September 9, 1942, Mount Emily near Brookings became the only site in the mainland United States and the second in the continental territory after the bombing of Dutch Harbor to suffer aerial bombardment during World War II. A Japanese floatplane piloted by Nobuo Fujita was launched from submarine I-25. The plane was armed with two incendiary bombs on a mission intended to start massive fires in the dense forests of the Pacific Northwest.

Recent 
The current marketing "brand" for the community, through the Brookings-Harbor Chamber of Commerce, is "The Pulse of America's Wild Rivers Coast". America's Wild Rivers Coast is a regional marketing brand for Curry County, Oregon, and Del Norte County, California.

2011 Tsunami 
The Port of Brookings Harbor was damaged by tidal surges from a tsunami on March 11, 2011. Boats were damaged, sunk, set adrift, and swept out to sea after many docks were torn away and pilings broken. The tsunami was caused by the 9.0 MW Tōhoku earthquake offshore of the east coast of Honshu Island, Japan. The damage was estimated at $25 million to $30 million.

Geography 

Brookings is located along the southern Oregon coast at the mouth of the Chetco River.

Climate

Brookings enjoys a mild "banana belt" Mediterranean climate (Köppen climate classification Csb).

A weather phenomenon known as the "Chetco effect" or the "Brookings effect" can cause the temperature in Brookings near the Chetco River mouth to be much higher than the surrounding area. Adiabatic heating increases the temperature and reduces relative humidity as katabatic wind, driven by high pressure on the Great Basin, descend across the west slopes of the Cascade Range and Oregon Coast Range. The heart of Brookings, with its orientation, is protected from sea breezes coming from the northwest and the warm, dry, down-sloping winds that are funneled down the Coastal Range into the deep Chetco River gorge can reach the coast uninfluenced by the effects of the Pacific.

This was not only the highest recorded temperature in the town's history, but also the highest recorded in Oregon on that day. The Crescent City airport, around 30 miles south of Brookings, recorded a high temperature of   that day,  cooler. Temperatures in inland Oregon throughout the Willamette Valley reached temperatures into the mid-90s.

Notes

Demographics

2010 census
As of the census of 2010, there were 6,336 people, 2,717 households, and 1,689 families residing in the city. The racial makeup of the city was 92.2% White, 0.3% African American, 1.8% Native American, 0.9% Asian, 0.1% Pacific Islander, 0.9% from other races, and 3.6% from two or more races. Hispanic or Latino of any race were 6.6% of the population.

There were 2,717 households, of which 26.7% had children under the age of 18 living with them, 46.7% were married couples living together, 11.0% had a female householder with no husband present, 4.5% had a male householder with no wife present, and 37.8% were non-families. 31.3% of all households were made up of individuals, and 15.4% had someone living alone who was 65 years of age or older. The average household size was 2.26 and the average family size was 2.81.

The median age in the city was 46.9 years. 21.1% of residents were under the age of 18; 7% were between the ages of 18 and 24; 19.8% were from 25 to 44; 28% were from 45 to 64; and 24.2% were 65 years of age or older. The gender makeup of the city was 47.7% male and 52.3% female.

Parks and recreation

Azalea Park 
Azalea Park is located at 640 Old County Road. It has picnic areas, bandshell, snackshack, gazebo, Kidtown playground, disc golf course, softball and soccer fields, and the Capella by the Sea. Several cultural events in the town are held at Azalea Park.

Harris Beach State Park  
Harris Beach State Park is located on Highway 101 at the north end of Brookings. It includes 173 acres (70 ha) of coastal access as well as RV and tent camping facilities and a rest area.

Arts and culture

Annual cultural events
Each year, the town hosts the "Pirates of the Pacific" festival.

One major event in the town is the Azalea Festival, which includes the Azalea Parade and live music. It is held every year on Memorial Day Weekend.

Another very popular event in Brookings is the Nature's Coastal Holiday light display which takes is open each evening from Thanksgiving weekend through Christmas in Azalea Park.

Media

KCIW.org 100.7 FM 
Curry Coast Community Radio

Radio
 KSEP-FM (Brookings Seventh-day Adventist Church)

KCIW.org 100.7 FM 
CURRY COAST COMMUNITY RADIO

References

External links

 Entry for Brookings in the Oregon Blue Book

 Brookings Chamber of Commerce
 The Unlikely Bond Between An Oregon Town And The Man Who Bombed It Produced by Oregon Public Broadcasting

 
Cities in Oregon
Populated coastal places in Oregon
Company towns in Oregon
Cities in Curry County, Oregon
Micropolitan areas of Oregon
Port cities in Oregon
Populated places established in 1908
1908 establishments in Oregon